Arbabi-ye Sofla (also Romanized as Ārbābī-ye Soflá) is a village in Kavar Rural District, in the Central District of Kavar County, Fars Province, Iran. At the 2006 census, its population was 1,265, in 288 families.

References 

Populated places in Kavar County